Swadhin Kumar Mandal (Bengali: স্বাধীন কুমার মন্ডল) is a Bengali Indian organometallic chemist and a professor at the department of chemical sciences of the Indian Institute of Science Education and Research, Kolkata. Mandal, an Alexander von Humboldt Fellow, is known for his studies in the fields of catalysis, new drug development and material chemistry. The Council of Scientific and Industrial Research, the apex agency of the Government of India for scientific research, awarded him the Shanti Swarup Bhatnagar Prize for Science and Technology, one of the highest Indian science awards, for his contributions to chemical sciences in 2018.. In 2020, he was awarded the Friedrich Wilhelm Bessel Research Award by Alexander von Humboldt (AvH) Foundation, Germany in recognition of his outstanding research accomplishments. In 2022, he was awarded the Erna and Jakob Michael visiting professorship at the Weizmann Institute of Science, Israel.

Biography 

Swadhin Kumar Mandal, born on 15 August 1973 in the Indian state of West Bengal, graduated with honors in chemistry from the University of Kalyani in 1993 and followed it up with a master's degree from the same university in 1996. Subsequently, he enrolled for doctoral studies at the Indian Institute of Science under the guidance of 
Setharampattu Seshaiyer Krishnamurthy and after securing a PhD in 2002, he moved to the US to do the post-doctoral studies, under Robert C. Haddon of the University of California at Riverside (2002–2006); later, he worked at the laboratory of Herbert W. Roesky of the University of Göttingen (2006–2007), holding an Alexander von Humboldt fellowship. During his stay in the US. he also worked at Carbon Solutions, Inc. California, and on his return to India, he joined the Indian Institute of Science Education and Research, Kolkata (IISER Kolkata) where he holds the position of a professor. At IISER, he heads a laboratory, Swadhin K. Mandal's Sensitive Lab where he hosts several researchers.

Mandal focuses his research on designing dual catalyst for hydroamination and has published a number of articles. ResearchGate, an online repository of scientific articles has listed 85 of them. The Council of Scientific and Industrial Research awarded him the Shanti Swarup Bhatnagar Prize, one of the highest Indian science awards in 2018.

Selected bibliography

See also 

 Drug development
 Catalysis

Notes

References

External links 
 

Recipients of the Shanti Swarup Bhatnagar Award in Chemical Science
Indian scientific authors
Living people
Scientists from West Bengal
Academic staff of the Indian Institutes of Science Education and Research
1973 births
University of Kalyani alumni
Indian Institute of Science alumni
University of California, Riverside alumni
University of Göttingen alumni
Scientists from Kolkata